Win Pe Myint (born 1948) is a noted Burmese painter. In 1970, he graduated from Rangoon Arts and Sciences University with a Botany major. He was extremely interested in painting since childhood. He studied under 4 outstanding art masters: Lun Gywe, Shwe Oung Thame, Paw Oo Thet and Thein Han (painter). He worked as an art teacher in Regional College - 3 from 1984 to 1986. He should not be confused with the earlier Burmese painter Win Pe of Mandalay, born in 1936, who was a contemporary of Paw Oo Thet, and one of the early founders of modernist painting in Burma.

Win Pe Myint is particularly well known for his excellent still life works, although in recent years he has been painting landscapes and portraits. In February 2005 he opened his new studio (True Colour) in Hlaingthaya Township, designed by architect Aung Soe Myint. The studio features over a hundred of his paintings.

Collections
 National Museum of Myanmar
 (Yangon) Universities Central Library
 Zenith Gallery, Yangon
 IVY Gallery
 Orient Gallery
 77 Gallery
 New Treasure Art Gallery
 NM Gallery
The Yangon Gallery

See also
 Paw Oo Thet
 Thein Han (painter)

Notes

Further reading
 

External Links:
WPM Pictures from Google Images

Living people
Burmese painters
1948 births
People from Magway Division
University of Yangon alumni